Angola–Mexico relations are the diplomatic relations between the Republic of Angola and the United Mexican States. Both nations are members of the United Nations. Neither country has a resident ambassador.

History
During the Atlantic slave trade, Portugal and Spain transported many African slaves from Angola to Mexico where they arrived primarily to the port city of Veracruz. Angola gained its independence from Portugal in November 1975. In January 1976, Mexico recognized the independence and established diplomatic relations with Angola. 

Soon after gaining independence, Angola entered into a civil war which lasted until 2002. During the war, Mexico vehemently opposed the presence of South African troops in Angola. In 1985, Mexican Foreign Minister Bernardo Sepúlveda Amor paid a visit to Angola. In 1997, towards the end of the Angolan civil war, Angola opened an embassy in Mexico City. In March 2006, Angolan Prime Minister Fernando da Piedade Dias dos Santos paid a visit to Mexico where he met with Mexican President Vicente Fox.

In 2009, Mexico opened an embassy in Luanda, however, due to the global economic crisis to which Mexico was not immune, the embassy in Angola closed only after a few months. In 2014, Mexican Foreign Minister José Antonio Meade paid a visit to Angola. During the visit, Foreign Minister Meade promised that Mexico would re-open an embassy in Angola, however, the embassy has not reopened. In November 2018, Angola closed its embassy in Mexico City. In December 2018, Angolan Foreign Minister Manuel Domingos Augusto attended the inauguration for Mexican President Andrés Manuel López Obrador.

In 2019, several hundred African migrants entered Mexico en route to the Mexico–United States border. Many of the migrants originated from Angola and were attempting to seek asylum in the United States and escape poverty and human rights abuses in Angola.

High-level visits
High-level visits from Angola to Mexico
 Prime Minister Fernando da Piedade Dias dos Santos (2006)
 Minister of Health Sebastiao Sapuile Veloso (2006)
 Foreign Vice-Minister Georges Rebelo Chicoti (2006)
 Minister of the Economy Abrahão Pio dos Santos Gourgel (2013)
 Foreign Minister Manuel Domingos Augusto (2018)

High-level visits from Mexico to Angola
 Foreign Minister Bernardo Sepúlveda Amor (1985)
 Foreign Minister José Antonio Meade (2014)
 Foreign Undersecretary Carlos de Icaza (2014)
 Director General for Africa and the Middle East María Carmen Oñate Muñoz (2014)
 Director General of ProMéxico Francisco González Díaz (2014)

Bilateral agreements 
Both nations have signed the following bilateral agreements: Memorandum of Understanding for the establishment of a consultation mechanism on materials of mutual interest (2004); Agreement on Educational, Cultural and Technical Cooperation (2014) and a  Memorandum of Understanding of Diplomatic and Academic Cooperation (2014).

Trade relations 
In 2018, trade between Angola and Mexico totaled US$6.4 million. Angola's main exports to Mexico include: oil; crankshafts; inflatable rafts; statuettes and other ornaments of wood; siliceous sands and quartz sands; marble sawed in sheets; propane; and butane. Mexico's main exports to Angola include: pipes; tractors; shampoos; wafers and waffles; chewing gums; plows; containers, including tank containers; diapers; textile materials and seeds for fine grain seeds. Mexican multinational companies such as Gurpo Gusi and Sukarne operate in Angola.

Diplomatic missions 
 Angola is accredited to Mexico from its embassy in Washington, D.C., United States.
 Mexico is accredited to Angola from its embassy in Pretoria, South Africa and maintains an honorary consulate in Luanda.

References 

Mexico
Bilateral relations of Mexico